Fígols is a village located in the municipality of Fígols i Alinyà, in Province of Lleida province, Catalonia, Spain. As of 2020, it has a population of 142. Fígols is the capital of the municipality of Fígols i Alinyà.

Geography 
Fígols is located 114km northeast of Lleida.

References

Populated places in the Province of Lleida